Tied may mean:

of a game, with the score equal or inconclusive, see Tie (draw)
of goods, sold as a mandatory addition to another purchase, see Tying (commerce)
of foreign aid, granted on the condition that it is spent in a given country, see Tied aid
of a dwelling, rented in exchange for work, see Tied cottage
of a pub, required to source from a given brewery, see Tied house
of two musical notes, played as a single note, see Tie (music)
of a knot, fastened
of a person, wearing a necktie

See also 

 Tie (disambiguation)
 Tide (disambiguation)
 Tiede (disambiguation)